Samuel Kent (c. 1683 – 8 October 1759) was an MP for Ipswich in the 8th, 9th, and 10th Parliament of Great Britain, sitting from 23 January 1735 to his death in 1759.

He was a younger son of Thomas Kent of Christchurch, Southwark, a Norway merchant.

He was appointed High Sheriff of Surrey for 1729–30. In 1731 he acquired the Fornham Hall estate at Fornham St. Genevieve, near Bury St Edmunds, Suffolk. He served as "Distiller to the Court" in 1739.  As an MP he reliably voted with the Whig court of George II.

He died in 1759. He had married Sarah, the daughter of Richard Dean, skinner, of London, and had 2 sons and a daughter, Sarah, who married Charles Egleton (later Sir Charles Kent, 1st Baronet). His estate passed in turn to a son and then his daughter Sarah and her husband.

References

 Robert Beatson, A Chronological Register of Both Houses of the British Parliament, from the Union in 1708, to the Third Parliament of the United Kingdom of Great Britain and Ireland, in 1807: From the Union in 1708, to the Third Parliament Of the United Kingdom Of Great Britain and Ireland in 1807, Volume 1, printed for Longman, Hurst, Rees, and Orme by J. Chalmers & Co., 1807;   (PDF)

1683 births
1759 deaths
Members of the Parliament of Great Britain for Ipswich
British MPs 1734–1741
British MPs 1741–1747
British MPs 1747–1754
British MPs 1754–1761
High Sheriffs of Surrey
Whig (British political party) MPs for English constituencies